Lomariopsis is the type genus of the fern family Lomariopsidaceae.

One economically important species exists only as an aquatic gametophyte form, commonly known as süsswassertang.  This species is closely allied to Lomariopsis lineata but has not yet been named as a species.

Species
, the Checklist of Ferns and Lycophytes of the World recognized the following species:

Lomariopsis amydrophlebia (Sloss. ex Maxon) Holttum
Lomariopsis boivinii Holttum
Lomariopsis boninensis Nakai
Lomariopsis brackenridgei Carruth.
Lomariopsis chinensis Ching
Lomariopsis christensenii Rakotondr.
Lomariopsis commersonii Rakotondr.
Lomariopsis congoensis Holttum
Lomariopsis cordata (Bonap.) Alston
Lomariopsis crassifolia Holttum
Lomariopsis decrescens (Baker) Kuhn
Lomariopsis × farrarii R.C.Moran & J.E.Watkins
Lomariopsis fendleri D.C.Eaton
Lomariopsis guineensis (Underw.) Alston
Lomariopsis hederacea Alston
Lomariopsis holttumii Rakotondr.
Lomariopsis intermedia (Copel.) Holttum
Lomariopsis jamaicensis (Underw.) Holttum
Lomariopsis japurensis (Mart.) J.Sm.
Lomariopsis kingii (Copel.) Holttum
Lomariopsis kunzeana (C.Presl ex Underw.) Holttum
Lomariopsis latipinna Stolze
Lomariopsis lineata (C.Presl) Holttum
Lomariopsis longicaudata (Bonap.) Holttum
Lomariopsis madagascarica (Bonap.) Alston
Lomariopsis mannii (Underw.) Alston
Lomariopsis marginata (Schrad.) Kuhn
Lomariopsis mauritiensis Lorence
Lomariopsis maxonii (Underw.) Holttum
Lomariopsis mexicana Holttum
Lomariopsis muriculata Holttum
Lomariopsis nigropaleata Holttum
Lomariopsis novae-caledoniae Mett.
Lomariopsis oleandrifolia Mett. ex Kuhn
Lomariopsis palustris (Hook.) Mett.
Lomariopsis pervillei Mett. ex Kuhn
Lomariopsis pollicina (Willemet) Mett. ex Kuhn
Lomariopsis prieuriana Fée
Lomariopsis pteridiformis (Ces.) Christenh.
Lomariopsis recurvata Fée
Lomariopsis rossii Holttum
Lomariopsis salicifolia (Kunze) Lellinger
Lomariopsis sorbifolia (L.) Fée
Lomariopsis spectabilis (Kunze) Mett.
Lomariopsis subtrifoliata (Copel.) Holttum
Lomariopsis tenuifolia (Desv.) Christ
Lomariopsis underwoodii Holttum
Lomariopsis variabilis (Willd.) Fée
Lomariopsis vestita E.Fourn.
Lomariopsis warneckei (Hieron.) Alston
Lomariopsis wrightii Mett ex Eaton

References

External links
Lomariopsis homepage

Polypodiales
Fern genera
Taxa named by Antoine Laurent Apollinaire Fée